A Story Tale is an album by jazz saxophonists Clifford Jordan and Sonny Red which was recorded in 1961 and released on the Jazzland label.

Track listing
All compositions by Clifford Jordan except as indicated
 "Cumberland Court" - 3:40
 "A Story Tale" - 4:48
 "You're Driving Me Crazy" (Walter Donaldson) - 5:39  
 "Defiance" (Sonny Red) - 3:23 
 "Prints" (Red) - 6:03
 "Hip Pockets" (Jordan, Red) - 5:00   
 "They Say It's Wonderful" (Irving Berlin) - 5:12 
 "If I Didn't Care" (Jack Lawrence) - 5:13

Personnel
Clifford Jordan — tenor saxophone
Sonny Red - alto saxophone
Tommy Flanagan (tracks 1-5), Ronnie Mathews (tracks 6-8) - piano 
Art Davis - bass
Elvin Jones - drums

References

1961 albums
Clifford Jordan albums
Sonny Red albums
Jazzland Records (1960) albums
Albums produced by Orrin Keepnews